The Chéran is a  long river in the Savoie and Haute-Savoie départements, eastern France. Its source is at Verrens-Arvey, in the massif des Bauges. It flows generally northwest. It is a left tributary of the Fier into which it flows at Rumilly.

Départements and communes along its course
This list is ordered from source to mouth: 
Savoie: Verrens-Arvey, Cléry, Jarsy, École, La Compôte, Le Châtelard, La Motte-en-Bauges, Lescheraines, Arith, Bellecombe-en-Bauges 
Haute-Savoie: Allèves, Cusy, Gruffy, Héry-sur-Alby, Mûres, Alby-sur-Chéran, Saint-Sylvestre, Marigny-Saint-Marcel, Boussy, Rumilly, Sales

References

Rivers of France
Rivers of Haute-Savoie
Rivers of Savoie
Rivers of Auvergne-Rhône-Alpes